Leconfield is a village and civil parish in the East Riding of Yorkshire, England, about  north-west of Beverley town centre on the A164 road. The civil parish consists of Leconfield, the village of Arram and the hamlet of Scorborough. The 2011 UK census gave the parish a population of 2,127, an increase on the 2001 UK census figure of 1,990.

History
Leconfield Castle was the home of the Percy family, Dukes of Northumberland. There are extensive Tudor brick remains on the visible mound and the moat also remains. Among those born there was William Percy (1428–1462), Bishop of Carlisle. John Leland (16th century) described Leconfield Castle as a large house enclosed by a moat and a large attractive park; three quarters of the house was built of timber, the rest of brick and stone.

In 1823, Leconfield (then spelt 'Leckonfield') was a civil parish in the Wapentake of Harthill. The parish church was under the patronage of George Wyndham, 3rd Earl of Egremont. A medieval Lord of the manor had been Peter de Brus, Lord of Skelton. The population in 1823 was 302, and the occupations included ten farmers, one of whom was the landlord of The Roebuck public house, a bricklayer, a shopkeeper, a carpenter, a blacksmith, and butcher, and the landlady of The Bay Horse public house.

Community

Leconfield was home to RAF Leconfield until 1977, when the RAF withdrew and the Army School of Mechanical Transport (now the Defence School of Transport) took over the site. However, until 2015, Leconfield was used by the RAF as an airfield for their Sea King helicopters of 202 Squadron.

The church, dedicated to St Catherine, was designated a Grade I listed building in 1968. It features in the National Heritage List for England maintained by Historic England.

The village used to contain a post office, which shut in 2022. Leconfield Recreation Club, with a football pitch, is located in Miles Lane.

References

External links

Villages in the East Riding of Yorkshire
Civil parishes in the East Riding of Yorkshire